Enrique Montana III (born February 27, 2001) is an American soccer player who currently plays for Clemson Tigers.

Career
Montana joined the Seattle Sounders FC academy in 2015. He made his debut for USL club Seattle Sounders FC 2 in September 2018.

After leaving the Seattle Sounders academy, Montana III began playing college soccer at Clemson University in 2019.

References

External links

2001 births
Living people
American soccer players
Association football defenders
Tacoma Defiance players
Clemson Tigers men's soccer players
Soccer players from Washington (state)
Sportspeople from King County, Washington
USL Championship players